Nuranang Falls (also known as Bong Bong Falls), some 100 metres high, is located in the Tawang district of Arunachal Pradesh, India. It is one of the most spectacular waterfalls in this part of the country, yet is unknown to many travelers. It lies some 2 kilometres away from the town of Jang on the road connecting Tawang and Bomdila, so it is also known as the Jang Falls. There is a small hydel plant located near the base that generates electricity for local use.

The Nuranang river originates from the Northern slopes of the Sela Pass. Just below the waterfall it falls into the Tawang river.

According to a popular myth, Nuranang river and Nuranang falls are named after a local Monpa girl named Nura who had helped a soldier, Rifleman Jaswant Singh Rawat, Maha Vir Chakra (posthumous) in the 1962 Sino-Indian War and was later captured by the Chinese forces. The actual circumstances of Jaswant's heroism are more prosaic and no woman finds a place there. It is possible that the name Nuranang was bestowed well before 1962.

Trivia
It came to limelight when a song from the movie Koyla featuring Bollywood actress Madhuri Dixit, Tanhai Tanhai Tanhai was shot here and at Sangetser Lake in 1997. It was the first shot from the state shown in a Bollywood movie.

And second was a song named "Mitha Mitha" from Hiya Diya Niya in 2000.

External links 
 
 http://wikimapia.org/10331069/Nuranang-Falls-or-Jung-Falls
 http://www.tripadvisor.com/LocationPhotos-g858483-d1632959-Nuranang_Falls-Tawang_Arunachal_Pradesh.html
 Nuranang Falls and around

References

Waterfalls of Arunachal Pradesh
Environment of Arunachal Pradesh
Tawang district
Waterfalls of India